Ashanti is a 1982 Hindi-language action-crime film directed by Umesh Mehra, starring Rajesh Khanna, Mithun Chakraborty, Zeenat Aman, Parveen Babi, Shabana Azmi, Jeevan and Amrish Puri.

Cast

 Rajesh Khanna as Inspector Kumar Chandra Singh
 Mithun Chakraborty as Shankar Dada
 Zeenat Aman as Sonia
 Parveen Babi as Sunita
 Shabana Azmi as Kamini
 Jeevan as Malik
 Amrish Puri as Raja Bheesham Bahadur Singh
 Mohan Choti as Mohan
 Mac Mohan as Durjan
 Kanwaljeet Singh as Tony 
 Padma Chavan as Kumar's Mother
 Avtar Gill as Raghu
 Narendra Nath as Sampat
 Viju Khote as Francis
 Nadira as Ashram Principal
 Satyen Kappu as Police Commissioner
 Ramesh Deo as Inspector Mahesh

Soundtrack

References

External links
 

1982 films
1980s Hindi-language films
Films scored by R. D. Burman
Fictional portrayals of police departments in India
Films directed by Umesh Mehra